Bellwood is an unincorporated community in Geneva County, Alabama, United States. Bellwood has a post office with ZIP code 36313.

Demographics

According to the U.S. Census for 1910, Bellwood initially incorporated in 1907. The incorporated lapsed in the 1910s and it did not appear on the 1920 census rolls. It reincorporated in 1925 and was listed from 1930 to 1960. It disincorporated at some point in the 1960s.

References

Unincorporated communities in Geneva County, Alabama
Unincorporated communities in Alabama